Wolfgang von Haffner (10 September 1810 – 28 April 1887) was a Danish military officer and politician.

He was born in Valby as a son of Johan Wolfgang Reinhold Haffner and a nephew of Adam Mogens Wenzel Haffner. In November 1832, he married Sophie Wilhelmine Caroline Krieger (1807–1889). He had a military career in his early life, being second lieutenant at the age of 15. He became chamberlain in 1847 and general à la suite in 1871.

He was a member of the Danish Landsting from 1866 to his death. He became the Interior Ministers of Denmark in the Cabinet of Frijs on 22 September 1869, and held this position until 28 May 1870 when the cabinet fell. He immediately joined the new Cabinet of Holstein-Holsteinborg, as both War Minister and Navy Minister. He left in 1872 due to disagreements with the Finance Minister, Andreas Frederik Krieger. On 11 June 1875, when the Estrup Cabinet assumed office, Haffner returned to both his posts. He left on 28 July 1877.

He was decorated with the Grand Cross of the Order of the Dannebrog in 1877, and was ranked as Class 1 in the Danish order of precedence from 1880. He died in April 1887 in Copenhagen.

References

1810 births
1887 deaths
Danish military personnel
Members of the Landsting (Denmark)
Danish Interior Ministers
Danish Defence Ministers
People from Copenhagen
Grand Crosses of the Order of the Dannebrog